The Winchester and Western Railroad  is a shortline railroad operating from Gore through Winchester, Virginia and West Virginia to Hagerstown, Maryland. It also operates several lines in southern New Jersey, connecting to Conrail Shared Assets Operations at Millville and Vineland.

Growth 
The company's original line opened in 1917, extending west from Winchester to Wardensville WV, and while the 'Winchester and Western Railroad' operating company went through several reorganizations, it remained independent of larger carriers.
 
In 1986, it grew suddenly adding newly acquired trackage when Conrail sold off parts of the former Pennsylvania Railroad, allowing the W&W to acquire the line from Winchester to Hagerstown, as well as the greater part of the W&W's New Jersey trackage—formerly parts of the Pennsylvania - Reading Seashore Lines and Central Railroad of New Jersey (CNJ).

A short ex-CNJ branch from Bridgeton to Seabrook was acquired later from the Jersey Southern Railway in 1987.

The W&W is exclusively a freight line with the majority of its freight supplied by the quarry of its parent company, Unimin, in Gore. In New Jersey, the W&W also serves Unimin sand interests and some grain traffic.

History 
The Winchester & Western was initially incorporated on August 16, 1916 for the purpose of tapping the forests of southeastern Hampshire County, West Virginia and southwestern Frederick County, Virginia in order to supply railroad ties and timber to the Baltimore & Ohio Railroad. The idea of building such a conduit to tap these resources had been conceived during World War I when the traffic on the railways of the United States had been greatly increased. More railroad ties were needed to both construct new railways and maintain the lines already in use. A way to transport the hardwood timbers to the tie mills in Winchester was needed, and so the Winchester and Western was conceived.

The Baltimore & Ohio factored greatly in the W&W's construction and its local subsidiary, Winchester Lumber Company, owned various tracts of mountainous woodlands in Hardy, Hampshire, and Frederick Counties. It sought to build a 40-mile narrow gauge line from Winchester to Wardensville which would bisect the rich timber lands in the possession of the Winchester Lumber Company.

The Winchester Lumber Company sought the services of the Intermountain Construction Company to construct the line, which it then decided to make a standard-gauge instead of a narrow one. Intermountain started the grading of the railroad line from east and west of Chambersville, located west of Winchester in Frederick County. Because of the numerous supply and machinery shortages caused by World War I, Intermountain constructed the grade of the railroad using mule-powered scoops, sledgehammers, and hand-held drills. By August 1917, Intermountain had cleared a flat road for the rail track to Gainesboro and it began laying the rails and ties. On January 14, 1918 the first income producing train carrying 16,000 rail ties headed into Winchester.

From Gore, the W&W turned southward through Back Creek valley toward Rock Enon Springs and ultimately to Wardensville. On June 14, 1919, a "golden spike" ceremony was planned on the West Virginia/Virginia line near Capon Springs with only fifteen miles until completion. After politicians from both Hampshire and Frederick Counties delivered speeches, Hugh B. Cline, chairman of the Frederick County Board of Supervisors, and Judge F.B. Allen of the Hampshire County Court each hammered a spike. The "golden spike" celebration was then topped off with lunch at the Mountain House at Capon Springs Resort in Capon Springs.

On May 25, 1921, the Winchester and Western was finally completed to Wardensville. A celebration was held to honor the W&W's completion and former West Virginia Governor John J. Cornwell delivered a speech on the positive effect that the railroad would have on the future growth of the region's economy. John J. Cornwell's brother William B. Cornwell of Romney was the president of the Winchester and Western Railroad at the time and had previously been president of the Hampshire Southern Railroad in the South Branch Potomac River valley in the 1910s.

Throughout the 1920s beginning in May 1921, the Winchester and Western was primarily a bustling freight line with limited passenger service. The W&W's first passenger car (or railbus) was literally an automobile bus placed on rails. The railbus made two round trips daily between Winchester and Wardensville with 17 intermediate stops along the way. The most popular of these intermediate stops was at Capon Springs Station where passengers would arrive to dine or vacation at the Capon Springs Resort. Three automobile "railbuses" later made the two round trips between Winchester and Wardensville. Besides Wardensville and Capon Springs, major passenger and freight stations were constructed at Gainesboro and Gore. The W&W's own terminal was located at the Baltimore & Ohio Station at Kent and Piccadilly Streets in Winchester.

While freight traffic was the main business of the W&W, the residents of the Winchester area frequently chartered trains for pleasure trips to not only Capon Springs, but for scenic excursions and picnics at Capon Lake on the Cacapon River.

Later in the 1920s, the line was constructed further past Wardensville on three narrow-gauge spurs known as the Lost River Railroad. The use of these spurs and the mainline itself dwindled by the early 1930s as the Great Depression took its toll on the region's economy. Freight traffic to and from Wardensville declined and the line was trimmed back to Capon Springs Station in 1934 due to the exhaustion of the region's timber reserves. That same year, passenger service to Capon Springs ended, and the track was cut at Rock Enon Springs. The W&W further trimmed back its line during World War II in 1944 when it was cut at Gore. Because of Gore's active Unimin sand quarry, the Winchester and Western Railroad remains active between Gore and Winchester. Today, in the Winchester area, the Winchester and Western is affectionately referred to as the "Ol' Weak and Weary" because of its limited use. (Who calls it this?)

In recent years, the Winchester and Western has seen a revival of sorts. In 1986, it purchased the Conrail (formerly Pennsylvania RR/Penn Central) "Winchester Secondary" line from Winchester to Williamsport, Maryland. In 1987, it purchased three shortlines in southern New Jersey. The company now has two divisions; the "Virginia Division," and the "New Jersey Division." Both serve Unimin interests, as well as other freight. Both have connections with the two eastern mainline railroads, CSX Transportation and the Norfolk Southern Railway. In September 2019 the business was purchased by OmniTRAX.

Course 

From the B&O's old central station in downtown Winchester, the Winchester and Western Railroad ventures south and then follows Abram's Creek west out of the city. From there, the W&W travels northwest, eventually parallelling the Northwestern Turnpike (U.S. Route 50) where it goes through Hoop Petticoat Gap along Gap Run at Chambersville, today known as Round Hill. Still heading in a northwest direction with the Northwestern Turnpike, the W&W departs from the turnpike and follows Hogue Creek north, southeast of Hayfield. The W&W continues north until it intersects with the North Frederick Pike (U.S. Route 522) and enters the community of Gainesboro. The line then curves southwest into the Back Creek valley. At the southern edge of Bowling Green Ridge, the W&W crosses the Northwestern Turnpike one last time and follows Back Creek south to Gore. From Gore, the line heads south along Mine Spring Run where it currently ends at the sand mine.

This list includes all of the communities and stations that have been served at one time by the original Winchester and Western Railroad. The towns are listed from Winchester to Wardensville:

Frederick County, Virginia
Winchester
Chambersville
Hayfield
Indian Hollow
Gainesboro
Gore
Rock Enon Springs

Hampshire County, West Virginia
Shiloh
Capon Springs Station
Capon Lake
Intermont

Hardy County, West Virginia
Wardensville

References

External links

Virginia Railroad Association: Winchester & Western RR
Winchester & Western RR Website
HawkinsRails.net Winchester & Western page 

West Virginia railroads
Virginia railroads
Maryland railroads
New Jersey railroads
Transportation in Frederick County, Virginia
Transportation in Hampshire County, West Virginia
Transportation in Hardy County, West Virginia
Transportation in Washington County, Maryland
Hagerstown, Maryland
Railway companies established in 1916
Railway companies disestablished in 1930
Railway companies established in 1940
American companies established in 1940
OmniTRAX